CMHS may stand for several different entities:

Cabell Midland High School in Ona, West Virginia
Canon McMillan High School in Canonsburg, Pennsylvania 
Caddo Magnet High School in Shreveport, Louisiana
Central Memorial High School in Calgary, Alberta, Canada
Center for Mental Health Services
Central Mountain High School in Mill Hall, Pennsylvania
Cheyenne Mountain High School
Civic Memorial High School
Costa Mesa High School
Cox Mill High School in Concord, North Carolina
Crete-Monee High School
Cardinal McCarrick High School 
Cimarron-Memorial High School in Las Vegas, Nevada
Center Moriches High School in Center Moriches, New York